William Neville, Earl of Kent KG (c. 14059 January 1463) and jure uxoris 6th Baron Fauconberg, was an English nobleman and soldier.
He fought during the latter part of the Hundred Years War, and during the English dynastic Wars of the Roses.

Early life
Born circa 1405, he was the third son of Ralph Neville, 1st Earl of Westmorland, and his second wife, Joan Beaufort.

His mother was the legitimised daughter of John of Gaunt, 1st Duke of Lancaster and Katherine Swynford. John of Gaunt was the third surviving son of King Edward III of England and Philippa of Hainault. William was therefore a great-grandson of Edward III. However, the terms of the legitimisation of the Beaufort family specifically excluded them and their descendants from succession to the throne.

William was one of a number of the Neville sons to make a good match, marrying the Fauconberg heiress, Joan de Fauconberg, 6th Baroness Fauconberg suo jure, daughter of Thomas de Fauconberg, 5th Baron Fauconberg by his second wife, Joan Brounflete (died 1409), and taking the title Lord Fauconberg; just as his nephew, Richard Neville, married the Warwick heiress and became Earl of Warwick. William's marriage took place at some point before 1422. His wife was four years older than he was and was described as an idiot from birth. The Fauconberg estates were in North Yorkshire, a centre of power for other members of the Neville family.

Loyalty to the Crown
He seemingly had a conventional military career during the earlier part of Henry VI's reign. Knighted in May 1426, he was serving on the Scottish Borders in 1435. In 1436, he was serving with his brother-in-law Richard, Duke of York, in France — his first contact with a man who was later to receive his allegiance.  By 1439, he was a field commander in France, with Lords Talbot and Scales.  At the siege of Harfleur in 1440, he was made a Knight of the Garter for his part in the campaigns of 1438–39, in particular the capture and garrisoning of Meaux.

The town where Henry V had died was a crucial marches town for English Normandy.  They had re-supplied the town, also retaking Montargis and Gerberoy.  Fauconberg fought with the relief at Meaux when Richemont seized the stronghold by storm on 12 August 1439.  The English lords forced a confrontation, but the French fled, leaving twenty barges laden with supplies.

As one of the three field commanders, Neville had been put on the royal council since 30 April, on Warwick's death, before a new regent could emerge. In October, Fauconberg helped recapture Harfleur, expelling the French garrison; only Dieppe remained intransigent. The field commander's pre-eminence was supplanted in March 1442 by the appointment of William, Lord Bourgchier, as governor-general of Normandy.

On 7 March 1443, while back in England, he took custody of Roxburgh Castle. He was granted £1,000 per annum (around £1,000,000 at 2005 prices) during peacetime, twice this if at war with Scotland, and until 1448, satisfactory payment was made. However, in 1449, he returned to France as part of a diplomatic mission, and in May 1449 he spent the night that the French chose to capture Pont de l'Arche in Normandy. One hundred and twenty men were taken in all.

Neville was reluctant to surrender to a lowly archer, who almost killed him.  While in captivity in France, he spent two years of his own income supporting the upkeep of the castle. In spite of a grant from Parliament in 1449, by 1451 he was owed £4,109. He was forced to settle for less. The loss of such an experienced captain was a blow to English administration. The English had already lost the Bretons for taking their salt fleet, and then in July 1449, Somerset refused Fauconberg's return in a deal for Fougeres.

In 1453, he was ransomed (for 8,000 French ecus) and freed from captivity. He still had the custody of Roxburgh Castle, but was impoverished by maintaining this and by his captivity in France. By now, he was owed £1,000 by the government. He settled this by accepting a grant of 1,000 marks from the customs at Newcastle. Not only was this only worth about two-thirds of the original amount, there was no guarantee that he would ever get the money. As Griffths says, 
"What is so remarkable about his tale is that the Lancastrian crown could command [his] loyalty".

Alliance with York
Until this point, he can be seen as a loyal supporter of the House of Lancaster. However, at some time during the next two years, his allegiance began to shift. He was a member of the council of Richard, Duke of York, during Henry VI's second period of madness. Although he was with the Lancastrian nobility at the First Battle of St Albans (1455), he was appointed by York to be joint Constable of Windsor Castle after the battle. His alignment with York, who was his brother-in-law, was natural, as his brother, the Earl of Salisbury and his nephew the Earl of Warwick (the "Kingmaker") were Richard's principal allies.

In 1457, he joined Warwick (appointed Captain of Calais) as his deputy. Warwick used Calais as a base for what was essentially piracy, and Fauconberg seems to have been happy to assist. He was in England in 1458, and in May he was briefly imprisoned in London — but he was bailed by Warwick and returned to Calais.

Awards and appointments
The rewards of victory followed. He was made a member of the King's Council and appointed Lieutenant of the North. On 1 November, he was created Earl of Kent and appointed Steward of the Royal Household. In July 1462, he was appointed Lord Admiral, and in August that year he was granted 46 manors in the West Country.

Edward IV relied on him for both land and naval warfare. Following the victory at Towton, he took part in the gradual establishment of royal control in Northumberland, heading a garrison of 120 men at Newcastle in the summer of 1461, and taking part in the siege of Alnwick in November 1462. Between these dates, he was back in Calais, raiding the Breton coast in August 1462, then burning Le Conquet near Brest, and raiding the Ile de Re.

He died on 9 January 1463, and was buried at Gisborough Priory in the heart of his Fauconberg lands. As he had no surviving legitimate sons, the earldom became extinct. He was survived by his wife, who died in 1490 at the age of 84 (thus living through the reigns of all the English kings of the fifteenth century).  He had three daughters and one son from his marriage, and one acknowledged illegitimate son, Thomas Neville.  Known as the Bastard of Fauconberg, he was to align himself with Warwick and lead a revolt later in Edward IV's reign.

William Neville is an underrated figure in the rise to power of the Yorkist regime. More successful as a military leader than the more famous Richard Neville, 16th Earl of Warwick, his reputation is summed up in Goodman's words: "No other veteran of the Anglo-French Wars won such distinction in the Wars of the Roses".

Ancestry

References

Bibliography
Barker, J Conquest: The English Kingdom of France 1417-1450Little, Brown, 2009.  
Hicks, J Warwick the Kingmaker	
Ross, Charles Edward IV	
Goodman, J Wars of the Roses	
Kendall, M.J Warwick the Kingmaker	
Griffiths, R.J Henry VI	
Gillingham, J Wars of the Roses	
Wolffe, B Henry VI	
Storey, R.L End of the House of Lancaster	
Johnson Richard Duke of York

External links
 Lord Fauconberg's coat of arms
 Neville Family Tree There are several Neville genealogy sites - this is one of the easiest to navigate

1463 deaths
15th-century English people
15th-century English Navy personnel
People of the Hundred Years' War
People of the Wars of the Roses
Lord High Admirals of England
Earls of Kent
Knights of the Garter
Younger sons of earls
William
Year of birth uncertain
1410 births
Burials at Gisborough Priory
Earls in the Peerage of England